And Satan Calls the Turns is a 1962 French film directed by Grisha Dabat and starring Catherine Deneuve.

It was known in France as Et Satan conduit le bal.

Cast 
 Catherine Deneuve as Manuelle
 Jacques Perrin as Ivan
 Bernadette Lafont as Isabelle
 Jacques Doniol-Valcroze as Éric
 Françoise Brion as Monica
 Henri-Jacques Huet as Jean-Claude
 Jacques Monod as Monsieur Klaus

External links

French drama films
1960s French-language films
1960s French films